Alderman Peel High School is an academy secondary school in Wells-next-the-Sea, Norfolk, England.

History

The founder

Sam Peel, who was born in Wymondham, was not a Birthright Quaker, but by Conviction who had started off as a Methodist. He was permissive and tolerant. His faith and life of service started on him seeing the extreme poverty of the seafolk in Wells during a visit in 1909, which he attributed to alcohol and the public houses being the only social meeting places. He campaigned against drink and extended the Meeting House.

He constructed the first council houses in Wells-next-the-Sea, during World War I using the powers in the Housing of the Working Classes Act 1900. He was chair of the Norfolk Education Committee from 1943 until 1968. He steered through the Education Act 1944.

The secondary modern school
The school was founded in 1963 by Alderman Sam Peel, chair of the Norfolk Education Committee, as a secondary modern school.

The school became part of the Wensum Trust multi-academy trust in 2017. The trust includes Acle Academy, Hellesdon High School and seven primary schools.

Inspection judgements
 In 2009 Ofsted judged the school as Outstanding.
 In 2012 Ofsted judged the school as Good.

Headteachers
 2005–2010: John Platten
 2010–present: Alastair Ogle

Academic results
In 2017 GCSE results were below average for the Progress 8 benchmark and the linked Attainment 8 measure.

Wells-Next-The-Sea Primary and Nursery School
The nearby primary school was in a 'hard federation' with the secondary school until both converted to an academy in 2017. The primary school had received a warning notice in 2016 because of its poor exam results.

References

External links
 Alderman Peel High School at the Wensum Trust

Secondary schools in Norfolk
Academies in Norfolk
Wells-next-the-Sea